Nan Kai University of Technology (NKUT) is a private university in Caotun Township, Nantou County, Taiwan.

NKUT offers a wide range of undergraduate and graduate programs across various disciplines such as engineering, design, management, and humanities. The university has four colleges: the College of Engineering, the College of Design, the College of Management, and the College of Humanities.

History
NKUT was founded as Nan Kai Junior College in 1971. In August 1993, the college was renamed to Nan Kai Junior College of Technology and Commerce. In August 2001, the college was accredited as Nan Kai Institute of Technology. In August 2008, the school was renamed to Nan Kai University of Technology.

Faculties
 College of Electrical and Computer Engineering
 College of Engineering
 College of Extension Education
 College of Human Ecology
 College of Management

See also
 List of universities in Taiwan

References

External links
 

1971 establishments in Taiwan
Caotun Township
Educational institutions established in 1971
Technical universities and colleges in Taiwan
Universities and colleges in Nantou County
Universities and colleges in Taiwan